Sophie of Bar (c. 1004 or 1018 – January 21 or June 21, 1093) was sovereign Count of Bar and lady of Mousson between 1033 and 1093. She succeeded her brother, Frederick III, Duke of Upper Lorraine, ruled in co-regency with her spouse Louis, Count of Montbéliard, and was succeeded by her son Frederick of Montbéliard.

Life
She was a daughter of Frederick II, Duke of Upper Lorraine (died 1026/1027) and Matilda of Swabia. After her father died in 1026, she and her sister Beatrice went to live with their mother's sister, Empress Gisela. Her sister Beatrix (died 1076) married Boniface, margrave of Tuscany, and remarried after his death with Godfrey III, Duke of Lower Lotharingia.

Sophie was Countess of Bar between 1033 and 1092, in succession of her childless brother, Duke Frederick III of Upper Lotharingia (died 1033). 

She married Louis, Count of Montbéliard (1019–1071 or 1073). Their son Thierry I (1045–1105) succeeded to the county of Montbéliard and to the county of Bar.

Issue
 Thierry
 Bruno
 Louis, cited in 1080
 Frederick of Montbéliard
 Sophie, married to Folmar, count of Froburg
 Beatrice (died 1092), married to Berthold I of Zähringen (died 1078), duke of Carinthia
 Mathilde, married to Hugh of Dagsburg (died 1089)

Notes

Sources 
Sophie de Bar (from the French Wikipedia)
Sophie von Ober-Lothringen Gräfin von Sundgau-Pfirt (in German)
 

1000s births
1093 deaths
11th-century women rulers
House of Bar
Counts of Bar
People from Lorraine
11th-century French people
11th-century French women